Vincent Zhao Wenzhuo (born 10 April 1972), sometimes credited as Vincent Chiu or Chiu Man-cheuk, is a Chinese actor and martial artist. Zhao is best known for playing the Chinese folk hero Wong Fei-hung in the Once Upon a Time in China film and television series and for his films The Blade, True Legend  and God of War.

Early life
Zhao was born in Harbin, Heilongjiang, China the youngest of three boys. His father was a martial arts practitioner, and his mother was a professional sprinter, who broke the record for being the fastest female sprinter of Harbin. Under the instruction of his father, Zhao attended martial arts lessons at the age of eight but he never completely devoted himself to his lessons as he was more interested in singing. In the early 1980s, Zhao was sent to a martial arts academy in Harbin and began to train vigorously, where he started to love the sport. He soon became the youngest member of the Harbin wushu team, which was established in 1985. Trained in various wushu techniques, Zhao mastered Tongbeiquan, t'ai chi ch'uan, especially the Chen and Yang styles.

Zhao maintained high academic standards, and in 1990, he was accepted by Beijing Sport University to study martial arts. Throughout his university career, he joined many national championships, winning first place titles and gold medals for the National Junior Championship, the National All-Around Championship, and also the National Martial Arts Championship. He was also qualified to be in China's national martial arts team, and his classmates gave him the nickname, "Kungfu King".

Career

Fong Sai-yuk
In 1992, Hong Kong film producer Corey Yuen went to Beijing Sport University to find a martial artist to play the role of the antagonist for his 1993 film Fong Sai-yuk. Yuen found Zhao through the latter's instructor and was immediately impressed with Zhao. Initially, Zhao was uninterested, but Yuen insisted on offering him the role because he had "the skill and looks." After further encouragement from peers and mentors, Zhao accepted the offer and shooting began in the same year. Zhao was often teased for looking too nice and young for the role of the villain, the Governor of Nine Gates, but under the instruction of Yuen and other directors, he learned the easiest way to "look evil". He said, "The director told me: Chiu Man-cheuk, when you look at people, don't look at them like how you usually do. You must look at them from the corner of your eyes with your profile facing them. That way, you will look evil." During filming, Zhao also enrolled in acting classes for three months. Fong Sai-yuk was released in March 1993 and became a box office hit in Hong Kong, grossing HK$30,666,842.

Once Upon a Time in China
After only a month into the filming of Fong Sai-yuk, contract problems between Tsui Hark and Jet Li caused Li to back out from the fourth installment of the Once Upon a Time in China saga. Tsui met Zhao on the set of Fong Sai-yuk and was impressed with Zhao's performance that he quickly recruited Zhao to replace Li in playing the role of Wong Fei-hung. Tsui also encouraged Zhao to sign a three-year contract to be a full-time actor, but Zhao rejected the offer, stating that he felt that his education was more important. Zhao continued to devote himself to filming during school vacations for Green Snake (1993) and Once Upon a Time in China IV (1994). During filming for Green Snake, Zhao was hung high up in the air during a stunt with two steel wires supporting him but during an incident one of the steel wires broke and Zhao stated that if the other wire were to also break that he could have lost his life as well. Zhao was ultimately very frightened especially after filming this scene. During the filming of one of the Wong Fei Hung movies, he seriously injured his ankle to the point where it hadn't healed until the year 2012. He stated that some of the bones in his ankle still hasn't healed yet and that before this injury he was okay with doing the majority of his stunts even jumping from third or second story high buildings. The injury has also affected his flexibility as well.

Although Once Upon a Time in China IV grossed less in the box office than the first three installments, it was significant enough to continue the franchise with a fifth installment, Once Upon a Time in China V (1995). While shooting a scene, Zhao slipped during a fighting sequence and injured his head. He was rushed to the hospital and got stitches. He recovered quickly and shooting continued after several weeks. Once Upon a Time in China V was Zhao's last role as Wong Fei-hung in the films, as Jet Li returned for the sixth and last installment, Once Upon a Time in China and America (1997).

Zhao continued playing Wong Fei-hung in the television drama Wong Fei Hung Series, also produced by Tsui Hark. The series was aired on ATV in Hong Kong for two years and received high ratings (although Wong Fei Hung Series: The Final Victory only had moderate ratings).

1997–1999
In 1997, Zhao signed a management contract with China Star, a Hong Kong talent agency, after which he began to work on more films, such as The Blacksheep Affair (1998), Body Weapon (1999) and Fist Power (1999–2000). Many considered him as "the next Jet Li".

2000–2010
Zhao's contract with China Star ended in 1999, and he decided to turn his focus to the mainland Chinese market in hope of making more money (probably due to economic differences), working on television series and films such as The Sino-Dutch War 1661, Wind and Cloud and Seven Swordsmen. In 2006, Zhao returned to Hong Kong and began working on The Master of Tai Chi, produced by TVB.

During an interview concerning his career and the transition from movie actor to television actor. He said tactfully "at the beginning of the transition, my heart felt like it was in a uncomfortable state."

Reviews for Zhao's performance in television series were mixed, and many criticized him for giving up big productions and the silver screen. Zhao explained:
"I never took professional acting classes. The only thing I could do back then were sports and martial arts. In order to train myself, I must accept more television series to touch up my acting."

While working on The Master of Tai Chi, Zhao was given a script for a new martial arts film and he accepted the lead role. Zhao signed with Hollywood agency CAA in 2006 with help from Jackie Chan. He was originally selected to play the lead villain in Rush Hour 3, but the role was eventually given to Hiroyuki Sanada. After spending one year and a half in America, Zhao returned to Beijing and went into an obvious physical breakdown. In September 2008 he returned to Beijing to prepare for his next film, True Legend. True Legend opened up to mixed reviews and was a failure at the box office. In April 2010 Zhao joined Sacrifice'''s star-studded cast and was only given a minor role.

2011–present
Zhao starred alongside Yang Mi, Louis Fan, Xu Jiao and Dennis To in the 2012 martial arts fantasy film Wu Dang that was directed by Patrick Leung, written by Chan Khan, and action choreographed by Corey Yuen.

On 19 January 2012, in a press conference held in Beijing, it was announced that Zhao would be starring with Donnie Yen in the film Special Identity. However, on 29 February, Zhao left the production due to changes in the script by Yen.

Since March 1, 2017, Zhao is employed as Health Qigong ambassador.

In 2021, he joined the cast of Call Me By Fire'' as a contestant.

Personal life
Zhao graduated from Beijing Sport University in 1994 and decided to remain there as a martial arts instructor. However, due to his busy filming schedule, he only taught classes for three months before resigning.

During his time at Beijing Academy, Zhao signed on for two months of dancing classes and won the National College Dance Championship Competition.

He was once linked with Anita Mui in early 1995 but the pair broke apart in 1996.

Zhao had a son from a previous relationship with a Shanghai college student known as "Xiao Lian" studying in Canada and a reported pianist in 2001. His son, named "Zhao Yuanda", English name "Joseph", was born in August 2002. The reason for their break up is unknown. In 2004, Zhao Yuanda and his mother moved back to Beijing, where she opened a yoga center in the luxury apartments of Beijing Suburbs.

Zhao married his girlfriend Zhang Danlu, whom he met in 2002, in June 2006, and their daughter was born in September 2007. In November 2007, Zhao brought his family back to Beijing. At the airport, when interviewed, Zhao said his daughter is named "Rosita", Chinese name "Zhao Ziyang". His daughter shares the same name as the late politician Zhao Ziyang, whose name has been a taboo subject in China since 1989. On 15 July 2011, Zhao's wife gave birth in Hong Kong to their second son, who is named "Zilong" after the courtesy name of Zhao Yun, a famous general of the Three Kingdoms period. On 14 September 2016, Zhao and Zhang welcomed their third child (Zhao's fourth), a daughter named Luna Zhao.

Filmography

Film

Television

References

External links
 
  Vincent Zhao's blog on Sina.com

1972 births
Male actors from Harbin
Chinese wushu practitioners
Living people
Sportspeople from Harbin
Chinese male film actors
Chinese male television actors
People's Republic of China Buddhists